New Salem Township, population 3,532, is one of nine townships in Union County, North Carolina. This township does not contain any cities or towns within its borders.

Geography
The Rocky River forms the northern boundary of the township.  The northern part of the township is drained by the Rocky River and its tributaries and include Crisco Branch, Grassy Creek, Clear Creek, and Reason Branch.  The rest of the township is drained by Richardson Creek and its tributaries.  These tributaries include Water Branch, Gourdvine Creek, Salem Creek, Gold Branch, and Watson Creek.

References

Townships in Union County, North Carolina
Townships in North Carolina